Warnakulasuriya Uswaththa Liyanage Sabeetha Janaki Perera (born December 1, 1962) is an actress in Sri Lankan cinema and old Lollywood cinema of Pakistan. She is the most successful female superstar during the '80s and '90s  in Sinhala cinema.  Sabeetha has received a number of awards for her acting, including the Sarasaviya, OCIC, Presidential and the Swarna Shanka.

Personal life
Sabeetha was born on 1 December 1962 as the third of the four daughters to famous actor and director Anthony Stanley Perera and famous actress Girley Gunawardana. She has two elder sisters - Sandya, Sadna and one younger sister, Chandima. They lived in mother's home town, Mount Lavinia in early days and attended to Visakha Montessori for primary education and then to Visakha Vidyalaya, Colombo. After few years, they moved to father's home town Wennappuwa and completed her secondary education from Holy Family Convent, Wennappuwa.

She is married to Upali Jayasinghe, the managing director of D.P. Jayasinghe and the company.

Acting career
Sabeetha started her cinema career at the age of 3 years, when he played the role of daughter in her own father's film Ivasana Dana. Then she acted as the daughter of her own mother in the film Hathara Kendaraya. After the role in Yasapalitha Nanayakkara's film `Rosy, Sabeetha staged Pakistani film career. The Sinhala titled Sadaakal Randeva which was based on the novel Never say Good Bye screened in Pakistan as Kabi Al Vidana Kena. The film became a blockbuster hit in both countries as well. This induced Pakistani film makers to introduce Sabeetha for further Pakistani films and she completed 17 Urdu films at the end.

Sabita joins Pakistani cinema in 1986 to win Best Actress at the Alsakar Film Festival in Pakistan that same year for her Urdu film Nadiya. After her first Pakistani film Sadaakal Randeva, she then acted many Pakistani films such as Nadiya, Zameen Aur Aasman, Sabke Baap, Mashbu, Aagh Hi Aagh, Ruby, Donkaraya, Ayya Nago, Sebaliyo, Okkoma Hawul and Chandi Kello. Some of these are collaborated production works by Sri Lanka and Pakistan. Sabeetha won most popular award at Pakistan film festival for her role in the film Bobby. She also awarded with Al-Shakar Award for the Best Actress at the festival for her role in film Nadiya.

The first dramatic role of Sabeetha came through the film Deveni Gamana. For the role, she was awarded with Best Actress at the 1985 Sarasaviya Awards. Then her critically acclaimed roles came through Viragaya and Sisisa Gini Gani films. The role Bathee in Viragaya and Annette in Sisila Gini Gani are rated as the best ever roles played by Sabeetha.

Though she actively engaged in cinema industry more often, she also acted few television serials, such as Ran Kahawanu, Pitagamkarayo, Esala Kaluwara, Akala Sandya and Bharyawo. Sabeetha also acted in the stage drama Age Nama Rathi.

Filmography
 No. denotes the Number of Sri Lankan film in the Sri Lankan cinema.

Awards

Sarasavi Awards

|-

|| 1985 ||| Deveni Gamana || Best Actress Award || 
|-
|| 1987 |||  || Most Poppular Actress || 
|-
|| 1989 |||  || Most Poppular Actress ||

Presidential Awards

|-
||  |||  || Up and Coming Actress Award || 
|-
|| 1988 ||| Podi Wije || Best Actress Award || 
|-
|| 1992 ||| Sisila Gini Gani || Best Actress Award ||

Derana Sunsilk Film Awards

|-
|| 2016 ||| Address Na || Best Actress in a Supportive Role ||

Pakistani Film Corporation

|-
|| 2008 |||  || Special Award for Contribution ||

References

External links
 Court case against Sabeetha and her husband
 Sabeetha celebrates birthday at the "Whok".
 Rs.402 million more for ‘yahapalana’ agricultural building
 A pro in everything she does
සබීතාගෙන් කාර්යාල සංකීර්ණයක්
සුඛෝපභෝගී ජීවිතයට වඩා සරල ජීවිතයට අපි කැමැතියි
දැන් මම වැඩිපුර කියවන්නේ බෞද්ධ පොතපත
මම ගිය ආත්මේ ගොඩාක් මල් පූජා කරලා ඇති

Sri Lankan film actresses
Living people
1962 births